The 2011 IFMAR 1:10 Electric Off-Road World Championships was the fourteenth edition of the IFMAR 1:10 Electric Off-Road World Championship was held in Finland. The event proved a clean sweep for American Ryan Cavalieri winning both the 2WD and 4WD category.

The track was hard packed clay and a little over 200 m in run length and 3 meters wide. The track was packed with obstacles in the form of single jump, corner table, quadruple jump, logs, moguls, hump with negative banking, two single jumps, high speed double jump, double jump and a speed bump.

2WD results

4WD results

References

External links
 
 Official website archive
 Official race video coverage
 Official Facebook
 Red RC Coverage
 Oople Coverage

IFMAR 1:10 Electric Off-Road World Championship